Roger Hunt Mill is a historic grist mill complex located at Downingtown, Chester County, Pennsylvania.  The mill was built in 1759, and is a two-story, stone structure with a gambrel roof measuring 30 feet, 6 inches, by 48 feet.  It has a one-story frame addition.  The main house was built about 1740 and is a two-story, five-bay, stone structure with Georgian design details.  The house has a -story, stone extension built about 1850.  Other contributing buildings are the 2-story, Queen Anne-style carriage house; -story, Greek Revival style tenant house (c. 1850); and -story stone miller's house.

It was added to the National Register of Historic Places in 1980.

References

External links
 Hunt-Pollock Mill, Race Street, Downingtown, Chester County, PA: 2 photos, 6 data pages, and 1 photo caption page at Historic American Buildings Survey

Grinding mills on the National Register of Historic Places in Pennsylvania
Georgian architecture in Pennsylvania
Greek Revival houses in Pennsylvania
Queen Anne architecture in Pennsylvania
Industrial buildings completed in 1759
Grinding mills in Chester County, Pennsylvania
National Register of Historic Places in Chester County, Pennsylvania